Isaque Elias Brito (born 22 April 1997), known as Isaque, is a Brazilian professional footballer who plays for Guarani. Mainly an attacking midfielder, he can also play as a striker or a left winger.

Club career

Grêmio
Born in São Paulo, Isaque joined the Grêmio's Academy at the age of 20 in 2017. Isaque made his professional debut with Grêmio in a 1–1 Campeonato Gaúcho tie with São Luiz on 18 January 2018. He scored in August 2020 in the final of the second turn of the Campeonato Gaúcho against Grêmio's arch enemy Internacional.

Career statistics

Honours
Grêmio
Recopa Sudamericana: 2018
Campeonato Gaúcho: 2018, 2019, 2020

Fortaleza
Campeonato Cearense: 2021

References

External links
 

1997 births
Living people
Footballers from São Paulo
Brazilian footballers
Association football midfielders
Association football forwards
Campeonato Brasileiro Série A players
Campeonato Brasileiro Série B players
Grêmio Foot-Ball Porto Alegrense players
Fortaleza Esporte Clube players
América Futebol Clube (MG) players
CR Vasco da Gama players
Guarani FC players